Tessio is a surname. Notable people with the surname include:

 Aldo Tessio (1909–2000), Argentine politician
 Griselda Tessio (born 1946), Argentine politician, Vice-Governor of Santa Fe province since 2007

Fictional characters:
 Salvatore Tessio, fictional character in Mario Puzo's novel The Godfather and the film based on it

See also
 "Tessio" (Luomo), a single by techno musician Luomo